Apache Wink is a retired open source framework that enables development and consumption of REST style web services.

History 
The project was initiated in 2007 as an HP internal REST SDK called Symphony. At the beginning of 2009, HP and IBM joined forces to deliver the Apache Wink project, HP contributed the SDK and IBM contributed a lot of integration tests.

The Apache Wink has been retired from Apache Incubator 2017, April 25 and put in Apache Attic.

Features
Apache Wink is composed of a Server module and a Client module. The Server module is an implementation of the JAX-RS (JSR-311) specification along with additional features to facilitate the development of RESTful Web services. The Client module is a Java-based framework that provides functionality for communicating with RESTful Web services.

 JAX-RS 1.0 compliant
 Has support for Atom Syndication Format, Atom Publishing Protocol and RSS.
 Has support for JSON, CSV and OpenSearch.

Releases

See also
Apache CXF, a web services framework with JAX-RS support

References

External links

Wink
Java (programming language) libraries